Have a Heart is a game show that was broadcast on the DuMont Television Network. The 30-minute show ran from May 3, 1955, to June 14, 1955, and was hosted by John Reed King.

Have a Heart was one of the last shows broadcast on the DuMont network, along with It's Alec Templeton Time (ended August 26, 1955), What's the Story (ended September 23, 1955), and Boxing From St. Nicholas Arena (ended August 6, 1956).

Episode status
As with most DuMont series, no episodes are known to survive.

See also
List of programs broadcast by the DuMont Television Network
List of surviving DuMont Television Network broadcasts

References

Bibliography
David Weinstein, The Forgotten Network: DuMont and the Birth of American Television (Philadelphia: Temple University Press, 2004) 
Alex McNeil, Total Television, Fourth edition (New York: Penguin Books, 1980) 
Tim Brooks and Earle Marsh, The Complete Directory to Prime Time Network TV Shows, Third edition (New York: Ballantine Books, 1964)

External links
Have a Heart at IMDB
DuMont historical website
DuMont Television Network original programming
1955 American television series debuts
1955 American television series endings
1950s American game shows
Black-and-white American television shows
Lost television shows